is a 39 episode anime series that ran from  to  on NET (now TV Asahi).

Episode list

References

Devilman
Episodes